Vala or VALA may refer to:

Religion and mythology
 Vala (Vedic), a demon or a stone cavern in the Hindu scriptures
 Völva, also spelled Vala, a priestess in Norse mythology and Norse paganism

Fiction
 Vala (Middle-earth), an angelic being in J. R. R. Tolkien's fiction
 Vala Mal Doran, a fictional character in the Canadian-American television series Stargate SG-1
 Vala (Blake), a character in the mythological writings of William Blake
 Vala, or The Four Zoas, a poem by Blake

People
 Vala (clan), a Rajput clan found in Gujarat in India

Surname
 Aleš Vála (born 1973), a Czech ice hockey player
 Asad Vala (born 1987), a Papua New Guinean cricketer
 Jessie Rose Vala (born 1977), an American artist
 Jorge Vala (born 1984), a Portuguese academic
 Katri Vala (1901–1944), a Finnish poet 
 Lobat Vala (born 1930), an Iranian poet and activist
 Numonius Vala, a Roman family name, or any of the men of that name
 Vajubhai Vala, an Indian politician

Given name
 Vala Flosadóttir (born 1978), an Icelandic former pole vaulter
 Vala Chakradhar Rao (1928–1991), an Indian doctor and politician

Places
 Vala State, a former princely state of the British Raj
 Våla Hundred, see List of hundreds of Sweden
 131 Vala, an asteroid discovered in 1873 named after Völva

Other uses
 Vala (programming language), a programming language targeting GNOME's object system
 VALA, Libraries, Technology and the Future Inc., an Australian not-for-profit organisation
 Vala GSM, a mobile operator in Kosovo
 Vala halt, a closed railway station in the municipality of Silves, Portugal

See also
 Wala (disambiguation)

 Val (disambiguation)

 Valo (disambiguation)
 Vola (disambiguation)
 Volo (disambiguation)